Ture Sigvard "Thure" Sjöstedt (28 August 1903 – 2 May 1956) was a Swedish wrestler. In freestyle wrestling, he won a gold and a silver medal in the 1928 and 1932 Olympics, respectively, as well as a European title in 1934. He finished second at the 1927 European Championships in Greco-Roman wrestling.

In the mid-1930s Sjöstedt turned professional and toured the United States with teammate Johan Richthoff. He later developed alcoholism problems and was eventually found dead in his garden cottage.

References

1903 births
1956 deaths
Olympic wrestlers of Sweden
Wrestlers at the 1928 Summer Olympics
Wrestlers at the 1932 Summer Olympics
Swedish male sport wrestlers
Olympic gold medalists for Sweden
Olympic silver medalists for Sweden
Olympic medalists in wrestling
Medalists at the 1932 Summer Olympics
Medalists at the 1928 Summer Olympics
People from Kristianstad Municipality
Sportspeople from Skåne County
20th-century Swedish people